In woodworking and carpentry, hand saws, also known as "panel saws", are used to cut pieces of wood into different shapes. This is usually done in order to join the pieces together and carve a wooden object. They usually operate by having a series of sharp points of some substance that is harder than the wood being cut. The hand saw is a bit like a tenon saw, but with one flat, sharp edge.

Handsaws have been around for thousands of years. Egyptian hieroglyphics exist depicting ancient woodworkers sawing boards into pieces. Ancient bow saws have been found in Japan. The cut patterns on ancient boards may be observed sometimes to bear the unique cutting marks left by saw blades, particularly if the wood was not 'smoothed up' by some method. As for preservation of handsaws, twenty-four saws from eighteenth-century England are known to survive.

Materials for saw blades have varied over the ages. There were probably bronze saws in the time before steel making technology became extensively known and industrialized within the past thousand years or so.

The most popular material for handles of hand saws is applewood, with 2,000,000 board feet used annually for this purpose.

Sometimes cultures developed two main types of saw teeth: the cross cut saw teeth and the rip saw teeth. These cut into the wood using different mechanisms. Wood is composed of many long cells running length-ways. Thus, crosscut saws have sawteeth that are usually shaped, often with a metal file, in such a way that they form a series of tiny knifelike edges. The wood cells are contacted by the knife-edge of the tooth and cut. Rip saws, on the other hand, are usually shaped so that they form a series of tiny chisel-like edges. The wood cells are contacted by the chisel and 'ripped' apart from the bundle of other cells. It is common that people do not recognize the difference and use saws both ways. However, a rip saw is much faster than a cross-cut saw when cutting with the grain but leaves a very rough cut, often with splinters on the surface, and has more difficulty maintaining a straight cut when cutting across the grain. The cross-cut saw can cut in any direction but is much slower than needs be when cutting with the grain.

The development of saws was also affected by several factors. The first was the importance of wood to a society, the development of steel and other saw-making technologies and the type of power available. These factors were, in turn, influenced by the environment, such as the types of ores available, the types of trees nearby and the types of wood which was in those trees. Finally, the types of jobs the saws were to perform was also important in the development of the technology.

Among Basques and Australians, traditional hand sawing has generated rural sports. The Basque variant is called tronral.

See also
Types of saws
Musical saws
Saw set

References

External links

How to Sharpen a Saw Blade , article on how to sharpen a handsaw yourself

Hand tools
Saws
Woodworking hand tools

de:Fuchsschwanz (Säge)